Ioan Varga (born 5 January 1959) is a Romanian former footballer who played as a midfielder. His son, Dacian was also a footballer.

Honours
Dinamo București
Cupa României: 1985–86

References

1959 births
Living people
Romanian footballers
Association football midfielders
Liga I players
Nemzeti Bajnokság I players
CSM Deva players
CSM Jiul Petroșani players
FC Dinamo București players
Újpest FC players
Romanian expatriate footballers
Expatriate footballers in Hungary
Expatriate sportspeople in Hungary
Romanian expatriates in Hungary
Romanian expatriate sportspeople in Hungary